Muhammed Arif is a Pakistani judge who served as a served as Justice at the Supreme Court of Pakistan from 1998 to 2002. Within this period, he was Chief Justice of Gambia from 2001 to 2003.

References 

Year of birth missing (living people)
Living people
Pakistani judges